Bonnie St. John (born November 7, 1964) is an American former Paralympic skier, author, and public speaker. St. John had her right leg amputated below the knee when she was 5 years old. Despite these challenges, she went on to excel as an athlete, a scholar, a mother and a businesswoman. She is the first African-American to win medals in Winter Paralympic competition as a ski racer, and the first African-American to medal in any paralympic event. St. John earned bronze and silver medals in several alpine skiing events during the 1984 Winter Paralympics. After graduating from Harvard and earning a Rhodes Scholarship, St. John went on to successful corporate career, first in sales with IBM, then as a corporate consultant. She has also written six books, including one each with her daughter Darcy, and her husband, Allen P. Haines.

Early life
Bonnie St. John was born in Detroit on November 7, 1964, and was raised in San Diego. Her mother, Ruby Cremaschi-Schwimmer, was a  principal at Lincoln High School (San Diego). Her father, Lee St. John, left before she was born. Her mother later married an older man, who physically abused St. John and her older sister. Due to a condition called pre-femoral focal disorder, St. John had her right leg amputated below the knee when she was 5 years old. After graduating magna cum laude from Harvard University in 1986, St. John won a Rhodes Scholarship to Trinity College, Oxford, where she earned her M.Litt. degree in economics in 1990.

Athletic career
At the 1984 Winter Paralympics in Innsbruck, Austria, St. John won a bronze medal in the slalom, a bronze medal in the giant slalom, and was awarded a silver medal for overall performance thereby earning her the distinction of being the second fastest woman in the world on one leg in that year.

Writing career
St. John has written six books: Succeeding Sane; Getting Ahead at Work Without Leaving Your Family Behind; Money: Fall Down? Get Up!; How Strong Women Pray; Live Your Joy; and written with her teenage daughter, Darcy Deane, How Great Women Lead.  Together, they traveled around the world on an extraordinary mother-daughter journey into the lives, and life lessons, of fascinating women leaders including Hillary Clinton, Condoleezza Rice, President of Liberia Ellen Johnson-Sirleaf, and Facebook COO Sheryl Sandberg. Her latest book is Micro-Resilience, with her husband Allen Haines.

Personal life
Bonnie St. John was formerly married to Dr. Grant Deane, an ocean acoustician and physicist at Scripps Institute of Oceanography.

At the 2002 Winter Paralympics in Salt Lake City, Utah, St. John spoke during the opening ceremonies.

In February 2007, as part of the celebration of Black History Month, St. John was honored at the White House by President George W. Bush who said: "[Bonnie St. John] is the kind of person that you really want to be around, and the kind of person that shows that individual courage matters in life."

In 2006 St. John was featured in a nationwide Starbucks campaign called "The Way I See It", which featured beverage cups with inspirational quotes from various public figures. St. John's quote was as follows: "I was ahead in the slalom. But in the second run, everyone fell on a dangerous spot. I was beaten by a woman that got up faster than I did. I learned that people fall down, winners get up, and gold medal winners just get up faster."

NBC Nightly News selected St. John as "One of the five most inspiring women in America". She has appeared on The Today Show, Good Morning America, CNN, Montel and the Discovery Health Channel. The New York Times and People have also profiled St. John and noted her extraordinary achievements. She worked in the White House during the Clinton administration as a Director for the National Economic Council, and is currently CEO of Courageous Spirit, Inc.

See also
Paralympics
Alpine skiing

References

External links
Interview with Bonnie St. John on "How Strong Women Pray." 
Interview with Grant Deane about his work recording the sounds of melting glaciers in Svalbard, Norway.

1964 births
Living people
American female alpine skiers
American Rhodes Scholars
Harvard University alumni
Alumni of Trinity College, Oxford
Paralympic alpine skiers of the United States
Alpine skiers at the 1984 Winter Paralympics
Paralympic silver medalists for the United States
Paralympic bronze medalists for the United States
Medalists at the 1984 Winter Paralympics
African-American sportswomen
African-American women writers
American Christians
African-American Christians
American Christian writers
American amputees
Sportspeople from Detroit
Sportspeople from San Diego
Paralympic medalists in alpine skiing
21st-century African-American people
21st-century African-American women
20th-century African-American sportspeople
20th-century African-American women
20th-century African-American people